Isaac Augustus Wetherby (1819-1904) or I.A. Wetherbee was an American painter and photographer. He worked in Boston, Massachusetts, and in Iowa. Examples of his work are in the Beverly Historical Society, Massachusetts; Fruitlands Museum; New York Historical Society; and the State Historical Society of Iowa.

References

Further reading
 Slonneger, Marybeth. Wetherby's Gallery: paintings, daguerreotypes, & ambrotypes of an artist. Iowa City, Iowa: Hand Press, c2006.
 "Wetherby Cottage holds historic charm." The Gazette (Cedar Rapids, Iowa), ca.2009

External links
 New York Historical Society: Portrait of Catherine M. Thayer, 1845 image by Wetherby.
 State Historical Society of Iowa Library, Isaac A. Wetherby Collection:  Old Capitol, Iowa, ca.1854 image by Wetherby.

American portrait painters
1819 births
1904 deaths
Photographers from Massachusetts
Painters from Iowa
Painters from Massachusetts
19th century in Boston
19th-century American painters
19th-century American male artists
American male painters
19th-century American photographers